Han Chinese Eight Banners were one of the three divisions in the Eight Banners of the Qing dynasty. Members of the Han Chinese Eight Banners were originally Han Chinese living in the Liaodong (modern Liaoning) of Ming dynasty. During the transition from Ming to Qing, these people were conquered by the Jurchen-led Later Jin dynasty. In 1631, Hong Taiji created the Han Chinese Eight Banners. Over time, other Han Chinese people who had surrendered to Qing dynasty joined the Han Chinese Eight Banners.

The Han Chinese Eight Banners played an important role in Qing conquest of Ming. After that Qing dynasty started governing the whole China. After this period being admitted into the Han Chinese Eight Banners became an honor for ordinary Han Chinese people.

During the latter half of the 17th century, some members of the Han Chinese Eight Banners were required to leave it. This was known as "Hanjun Chuqi" in Chinese.

See also
Identity in the Eight Banners

References

Eight Banners
Military history of the Qing dynasty

Military units and formations established in 1642
Military units and formations disestablished in 1928